Zvole is a municipality and village in Prague-West District in the Central Bohemian Region of the Czech Republic. It has about 1,900 inhabitants.

Administrative parts
The village of Černíky is an administrative part of Zvole.

References

Villages in Prague-West District